Denisia muellerrutzi is a moth of the family Oecophoridae. It is found on Corsica and Sardinia.

References

Moths described in 1939
Oecophoridae
Moths of Europe